Brandon Craig Lipscomb is an American politician who is currently serving in the Alabama House of Representatives. He is a member of the Republican Party.

References

Living people
1976 births
Republican Party members of the Alabama House of Representatives
21st-century American politicians